Dorcadion isernii is a species of beetle in the family Cerambycidae. It was described by Perez-Arcas in 1868. It is known from Spain.

See also 
Dorcadion

References 

isernii
Beetles described in 1868